Farap, also known as Farab, or Firabr, is a city in Çärjew District, Lebap Province, Turkmenistan.

Etymology
The name is of obscure origin and meaning. Vambery considered it a corruption of a Persian phrase meaning "pure water".

Overview
Farap is the site of a border crossing into Alat, Uzbekistan.

References

Populated places in Lebap Region